The 'egotistical sublime' is a phrase coined by John Keats to describe the poetry of William Wordsworth in a 1818 letter to Richard Woodhouse. The phrase expresses the underlying self-centered nature of Wordsworth's poetry, particularly his use of the narrative voice to convey his own conception of a singular truth. The egotistical sublime contrasts with Keat's perception of 'negative capability' which he believed to be the ideal and exemplified by the sonnets of William Shakespeare.

Other Uses
English literary scholar, John Jones, titled his 1954 work on William Wordsworth The Egotistical Sublime: A History of Wordsworth's Imagination

References

Literature
Romanticism